Skrzeszewo  is a village in the administrative district of Gmina Mogilno, within Mogilno County, Kuyavian-Pomeranian Voivodeship, in north-central Poland.

The village currently has a population of 95.

References

Skrzeszewo